Zhang Longhai was a Chinese diplomat. He was Ambassador of the People's Republic of China to New Zealand (1984-1987), Denmark and Iceland (1988-1991).

External links

Ambassadors of China to New Zealand
Ambassadors of China to Denmark
Ambassadors of China to Iceland